Ferdinand Frick (1878 in Kopparberg – 1939 in São Paulo) was a Swedish sculptor of bronze sculpture of the Art Deco period.

References

External links
 http://www.artnet.com/artists/ferdinand-frick/past-auction-results
 http://www.invaluable.com/artist/frick-ferdinand-a19234lo73

1878 births
1939 deaths
Art Deco sculptors
Swedish male sculptors
Swedish emigrants to Brazil